Gonorynchidae is a family of the Gonorynchiformes which has a number of fossil taxa and one extant genus, Gonorynchus, the beaked salmons.

References
Sepkoski, Jack (2002). "A compendium of fossil marine animal genera". Bulletins of American Paleontology. 364: 560. Archived from the original on 2011-07-23. Retrieved 2011-05-17.

 
Marine fish families
Taxa named by Albert Günther
Ray-finned fish families